Teng Pi-hui (born 13 June 1961) is a Taiwanese luger. She competed at the 1984 Winter Olympics and the 1988 Winter Olympics.

References

External links
 

1961 births
Living people
Taiwanese female lugers
Olympic lugers of Taiwan
Lugers at the 1984 Winter Olympics
Lugers at the 1988 Winter Olympics
Place of birth missing (living people)